The Bulgarian Army is the military of Bulgaria. The commander-in-chief is the president of Bulgaria. The Ministry of Defense is responsible for political leadership, while overall military command is in the hands of the Defense Staff, headed by the Chief of the Defense. There are three main branches of the Bulgarian military, named literally the Land Forces, the Air Forces and the Naval Forces (the term "Bulgarian Army" refers to them encompassed all together).

Throughout history, the Army has played a major role in defending the country's sovereignty. Only several years after its inception in 1878, Bulgaria became a regional military power and was involved in several major wars – Serbo-Bulgarian War (1885), First Balkan War (1912–13), Second Balkan War (1913), First World War (1915–1918) and Second World War (1941–1945), during which the Army gained considerable combat experience. During the Cold War, the People's Republic of Bulgaria maintained one of the largest militaries in the Warsaw Pact, numbering an estimated 152,000 troops in 1988. Since the Fall of Communism, the political leadership has decided to pursue a pro-NATO policy, thus reducing military personnel and weaponry. Bulgaria joined the North Atlantic Treaty Organization on 29 March 2004.

The patron saint of the Bulgarian Army is St. George. The Armed Forces Day or St. George's Day (6 May) is an official holiday in Bulgaria.

History of the Bulgarian Army

Medieval Period 

The modern Bulgarian military dates back to 1878. On 22 July 1878 (10 July O.S.) a total of 12 battalions of opalchentsi who participated in the Liberation war, formed the Bulgarian armed forces. According to the Tarnovo Constitution, all men between 21 and 40 years of age were eligible for military service. In 1883 the military was reorganised in four infantry brigades (in Sofia, Pleven, Ruse and Shumen) and one cavalry brigade.

Serbo-Bulgarian war

The Serbo-Bulgarian War was the first armed conflict after Bulgaria's liberation. It was a result of the unification with Eastern Rumelia, which happened on 6 September 1885. The unification was not completely recognised, however, and one of the countries that refused to recognise the act was the Kingdom of Serbia. The Austro-Hungarian Empire had been expanding its influence in the Balkans and was particularly opposed. Serbia also feared this would diminish its dominance in the region. In addition, Serbian ruler Milan Obrenović IV was annoyed that Serbian opposition leaders like Nikola Pašić, who had escaped persecution after the Timok Rebellion, had found asylum in Bulgaria. Lured by Austria-Hungary's promises of territorial gains from Bulgaria (in return for concessions in the western Balkans), Milan IV declared war on Bulgaria on 14 November 1885.

Military strategy relied largely on surprise, as Bulgaria had moved most of its troops near the border with the Ottoman Empire, in the southeast. As it happened, the Ottomans did not intervene and the Serbian army's advance was stopped after the Battle of Slivnitsa. The main body of the Bulgarian army travelled from the Ottoman border in the southeast to the Serbian border in the northwest to defend the capital, Sofia. After the defensive battles at Slivnitsa and Vidin, Bulgaria began an offensive that took the city of Pirot. At this point the Austro-Hungarian Empire stepped in, threatening to join the war on Serbia's side if Bulgarian troops did not retreat. Fighting lasted for only 14 days, from 14–28 November. A peace treaty was signed in Bucharest on 19 February 1886. No territorial changes were made to either country, but Bulgarian unification was recognised by the Great Powers.

First Balkan War

Instability in the Balkan region in the early 1900s quickly became a precondition for a new war. Serbia's aspirations towards Bosnia and Herzegovina were thwarted by the Austrian annexation of the province in October 1908, so the Serbs focused their attention onto Kosovo, and to the south for expansion. Greek officers, revolting in August 1909, had secured the appointment of a progressive government under Eleftherios Venizelos, which they hoped would resolve the Cretan issue in Greece's favor and reverse their defeat of 1897 by the Ottomans. Bulgaria, which had secured Ottoman recognition of its independence in April 1909 and enjoyed the friendship of Russia, also looked to districts of Ottoman Thrace and Macedonia for expansion.

In March 1910 an Albanian insurrection broke out in Kosovo. In August Montenegro followed Bulgaria's precedent by becoming a kingdom. In 1911 Italy launched an invasion of Tripolitania, which was quickly followed by the occupation of the Dodecanese Islands. The Italians' decisive military victories over the Ottoman Empire greatly influenced the Balkan states to prepare for war against Turkey. Thus, in the spring of 1912 consultations among the various Christian Balkan nations resulted in a network of military alliances that became known as the Balkan League. The Great Powers, most notably France and Austria-Hungary, reacted to this diplomatic sensation by trying to dissuade the League from going to war, but failed.

In late September both the League and the Ottoman Empire mobilised their armies. Montenegro was the first to declare war, on 25 September (O.S.)/ 8 October. The other three states, after issuing an impossible ultimatum to the Porte on 13 October, declared war on Turkey on 17 October. The Balkan League relied on 700,000 troops, 370,000 of whom were Bulgarians. Bulgaria, often dubbed "the Prussia of the Balkans", was militarily the most powerful of the four states, with a large, well-trained and well-equipped army. The peacetime army of 60,000 troops was expanded during the war to 370,000, with almost 600,000 men mobilized in total out of a population of 4,300,000. The Bulgarian field army consisted of nine infantry divisions, one cavalry division and 1,116 artillery units. Commander-in-Chief was Tsar Ferdinand, while the actual command was in the hands of his deputy, Gen. Mikhail Savov. The Bulgarians also possessed a small navy of six torpedo boats, which were restricted to operations along the country's Black Sea coast.

Bulgaria's war aims were focused on Thrace and Macedonia. For the latter, Bulgaria had a secret agreement with Serbia to divide it between them, signed on 13 March 1912 during the negotiations that led to the establishment of the Balkan League. However, it was not a secret that Bulgaria's target was the fulfillment of the never-materialized Treaty of San Stefano, signed after the Russo-Turkish War, 1877–78. They deployed their main force in Thrace, forming three armies. The First Army, under Gen. Vasil Kutinchev with three infantry divisions, was deployed to the south of Yambol, with direction of operations along the Tundzha River. The Second Army, under Gen. Nikola Ivanov with two infantry divisions and one infantry brigade, was deployed west of the First and was assigned to capture the strong fortress of Adrianople (now Edirne). According to the plans, the Third Army, under Gen. Radko Dimitriev, was deployed east of and behind the First and was covered by the cavalry division hiding it from the Turkish view. The Third Army had three infantry divisions and was assigned to cross the Stranja mountain and to take the fortress of Lozengrad (Kirk Kilisse). The 2nd and 7th divisions were assigned independent roles, operating in western Thrace and eastern Macedonia, respectively.

The first great battles were at the Adrianople–Kirk Kilisse defensive line, where the Bulgarian 1st and 3rd Armies (together 110,000 men) defeated the Ottoman East Army (130,000 men) near Gechkenli, Seliolu and Petra. The fortress of Adrianople was besieged and Kirk Kilisse was taken without resistance under the pressure of the Bulgarian Third Army. The initial Bulgarian attack by First and Third Army defeated the Turkish forces, numbering some 130,000, and reached the Sea of Marmara. However, the Turks, with the aid of fresh reinforcements from the Asian provinces, established their third and strongest defensive position at the Chataldja Line, across the peninsula where Constantinople is located. New Turkish forces landed at Bulair and Şarköy, but after heavy fighting they were crushed by the newly formed 4th Bulgarian Army under the command of Gen Stiliyan Kovachev. The offensive at Chataldja failed, too. On 11 March the final Bulgarian assault on Adrianople began. Under the command of Gen. Georgi Vazov the Bulgarians, reinforced with two Serb divisions, conquered the "untakeable" city. On 17/30 May a peace treaty was signed between Turkey and the Balkan Alliance. The First Balkan War, which lasted from October 1912-May 1913, strengthened Bulgaria's position as a regional military power, significantly reduced Ottoman influence over the Balkans and resulted in the formation of an independent Albanian state.

Second Balkan War

The peace settlement of the First Balkan War proved unsatisfactory for both Serbia and Bulgaria. Serbia refused to cede a part of the territories in Macedonia, which it occupied and promised to give to Bulgaria according to a secret agreement. Serbia, on its side, was not satisfied with the independence of Albania and sought a secret alliance with Greece. Armed skirmishes between Serbian and Bulgarian troops occurred.

On 16 June 1913, just a few months after the end of the first war, the Bulgarian government ordered an attack on Serbian and Greek positions in Macedonia, without declaring war. Almost all of Bulgaria's 500,000-man standing army was positioned against these two countries, on two fronts—western and southern—while the borders with Romania and the Ottoman Empire were left almost unguarded. Montenegro sent a 12,000-strong force to assist the Serbs. Exhausted from the previous war, which took the highest toll on Bulgaria, the Bulgarian army soon turned to the defensive. Romania attacked from the north and northeast and the Ottoman Empire also intervened in Thrace. Allied numerical superiority was almost 2:1. After a month and two days of fighting, the war ended as a moral disaster for Bulgaria, and at the same time its economy was ruined and its military demoralised.

First World War

The Kingdom of Bulgaria participated in World War I on the side of the Central Powers between 15 October 1915, when the country declared war on Serbia, and 29 September 1918, when the Armistice of Thessalonica was signed. In the aftermath of the Balkan Wars, Bulgarian opinion turned against Russia and the western powers, whom the Bulgarians felt had done nothing to help them. The government of Vasil Radoslavov aligned the country with Germany and Austria-Hungary, even though this meant also becoming an ally of the Ottomans, Bulgaria's traditional enemy. However, Bulgaria now had no claims against the Ottomans, whereas Serbia, Greece and Romania (allies of Britain and France) were all in possession of lands perceived in Bulgaria as its own.

In 1915 Germany promised to restore the boundaries according to the Treaty of San Stefano and Bulgaria, which had the largest army in the Balkans, declared war on Serbia in October of that year. In the First World War Bulgaria decisively asserted its military capabilities. The second Battle of Doiran, with Gen. Vladimir Vazov as commander, inflicted a heavy blow on the numerically superior British army, which suffered 12,000 casualties against 2,000 from the opposite side. One year later, during the third battle of Doiran, the United Kingdom, supported by Greece, once again suffered a humiliating defeat, losing 3,155 men against just about 500 on the Bulgarian side. The reputation of the French army also suffered badly. The Battle of the Red Wall was marked by the total defeat of the French forces, with 5,700 out of 6,000 men killed. The 261 Frenchmen who survived were captured by Bulgarian soldiers.

Despite the outstanding victories, Germany was near defeat, which meant that Bulgaria would be left without its most powerful ally. The Russian Revolution of February 1917 had a great effect in Bulgaria, spreading antiwar and anti-monarchist sentiment among the troops and in the cities. In June Radoslavov's government resigned. In 1919 Bulgaria officially left the war with the Treaty of Neuilly-sur-Seine.

The army between the World Wars

The Treaty of Neuilly-sur-Seine proved to be a severe blow to Bulgaria's military. According to the treaty, the country had no right to organize a conscription-based military. The professional army was to be no more than 20,000 men, including 10,000 internal forces and 3,000 border guards. Equipping the army with tanks, submarines, bombers and heavy artillery was strictly prohibited, although Bulgaria managed to get around some of these prohibitions. Nevertheless, on the eve of World War II the Bulgarian army was still well-trained and well-equipped. In fact, the Bulgarian Army had been expanded in 1935.

World War II

The government of the Kingdom of Bulgaria under Prime Minister Bogdan Filov declared a position of neutrality upon the outbreak of World War II. Bulgaria was determined to observe it until the end of the war but it hoped for bloodless territorial gains, especially in the lands with a significant Bulgarian population occupied by neighbouring countries after the Second Balkan War and World War I. However, it was clear that the central geopolitical position of Bulgaria in the Balkans would inevitably lead to strong external pressure by both World War II factions. Turkey had a non-aggression pact with Bulgaria. On 7 September 1940 Bulgaria succeeded in negotiating a recovery of Southern Dobruja with the Treaty of Craiova (see Second Vienna Award). Southern Dobruja had been part of Romania since 1913. This recovery of territory reinforced hopes for resolving other territorial problems without direct involvement in the war. The country joined the Axis Powers in 1941, when German troops preparing to invade Yugoslavia and Greece reached the Bulgarian borders and demanded permission to pass through its territory.

On 1 March 1941, Bulgaria signed the Tripartite Pact and officially joined the Axis bloc. After a short period of inaction, the army launched an operation against Yugoslavia and Greece. The goal of reaching the shores of the Aegean Sea and completely occupying the region of Macedonia was successful. Even though Bulgaria did not send any troops to support the German invasion of the Soviet Union, its navy was involved in a number of skirmishes with the Soviet Black Sea Fleet, which attacked Bulgarian shipping. Besides this, Bulgarian armed forces garrisoned in the Balkans battled various resistance groups. The Bulgarian government declared a token war on the United Kingdom and the United States near the end of 1941, an act that resulted in the bombing of Sofia and other Bulgarian cities by Allied aircraft.

Some communist activists managed to begin a guerrilla movement, headed by the underground Bulgarian Communist Party. A resistance movement called Otechestven front (Fatherland front, Bulgarian: Отечествен фронт) was set up in August 1942 by the Communist Party, the Zveno movement and a number of other parties to oppose the elected government, after a number of Allied victories indicated that the Axis might lose the War. In 1943 Tsar Boris III died suddenly. In the summer of 1944, after having crushed the Nazi defense around Iaşi and Chişinău, the Soviet Army was approaching the Balkans and Bulgaria. On 23 August 1944 Romania quit the Axis Powers, declared war on Germany and allowed Soviet forces to cross its territory to reach Bulgaria. On 26 August 1944 the Fatherland Front made the decision to incite an armed rebellion against the government, which led to the appointment of a new government on 2 September. Support for the government was withheld by the Fatherland Front, since it was composed of pro-Nazi elements, in a desperate attempt to hold on to power. On 5 September 1944 the Soviet Union declared war and invaded Bulgaria. On 8 September 1944 the Bulgarian army joined the Soviet Union in its war against Germany.

Cold War era
As the Red Army invaded Bulgaria in 1944 and installed a communist government, the armed forces were rapidly forced to reorganise following the Soviet model, and were renamed the Bulgarian People's Army (Bohlgarska Narodna Armija, BNA). Moscow quickly supplied Bulgaria with T-34-85 tanks, SU-100 guns, Il-2 attack planes and other new combat machinery. As the country was a Soviet satellite, it was a part of the Eastern Bloc and entered the Warsaw Pact as one of its founders. By this time the army had expanded to over 200,000 men with hundreds of thousands of more reserve troops. Military service was obligatory. A special defensive line, known as the Krali Marko defensive line, was constructed along the entire border with Turkey. It was heavily fortified with concrete walls and turrets of T-34, Panzer III and Panzer IV tanks.

The army was involved in a number of border skirmishes from 1948 to 1952, repulsing several Greek attacks, and took part in the suppression of the Prague Spring events. In the meantime, during the rule of Todor Zhivkov, a significant military-industrial complex was established, capable of producing armored vehicles, self-propelled artillery, small arms and ammunition, as well as aircraft engines and spare parts. Bulgaria provided weapons and military expertise to Algeria, Yemen, Libya, Iraq, Nicaragua, Egypt and Syria. Some military and medical aid was also supplied to North Korea and North Vietnam in the 1950s and 1960s. During the 1970s the Air Force was at the apogee of its power, possessing at least 500 modern combat aircraft in its inventory. Training in the Bulgarian People's Army was exhaustive even by Soviet standards; however, it was never seen as a major force within the Warsaw Pact. In 1989, when the Cold War was coming to its end, the army (the combined number of ground, air and naval forces) numbered about 120,000 men, most of them conscripts. There were, however, a number of services which, while falling outside of Ministry of Defense jurisdiction in peacetime, were considered part of the armed forces. These were foremost the Labour Troops (construction forces), the People's Militia (the police forces of the country, which fell under Ministry of the Interior jurisdiction, but the ministry was itself a militarized structure) and, more importantly, its Interior Troops, the Border Troops—which in different periods fell under either Ministry of Defense or Ministry of the Interior control—Civil Defense Service, the Signals Troops (government communications) and the Transport Troops (mostly railway infrastructure maintenance), which were two separate services under the Postal and Communications Committee (a ministry), etc. The combined strength of the Bulgarian People's Army and all those services reached well over 325,000 troops.

Modern era

With the collapse of the Warsaw Pact and the end of the Cold War, Bulgaria could no longer support a vast military. A rapid reduction in personnel and active equipment was to be carried out in parallel with a general re-alignment of strategic interests. In 1990, Bulgaria had a total of more than 2,400 tanks, 2,000 armored vehicles, 2,500 large caliber artillery systems, 300 fighter and bomber aircraft, 100 trainer aircraft, more than 40 combat and 40 transport helicopters, 4 submarines, 6 fast missile craft, 2 frigates, 5 corvettes, 6 torpedo boats, 9 patrol craft, 30 minesweepers and 21 transport vessels. Due to the economic crisis that affected most former Eastern bloc countries, a steady reform in the military could not be carried out; much of the equipment fell into disrepair and some of it was smuggled and sold to the international black market. Inadequate payments, fuel and spare part shortages and the disbandment of many capable units led to an overall drop in combat readiness, morale and discipline.

After partially recovering from the 1990s crisis, the Bulgarian military became a part of NATO. Even before that, Bulgaria sent a total of 485 soldiers to Iraq (2003–2008) as a participant in the Iraq War, and maintained a 608-men strong force in Afghanistan as part of ISAF. Bulgaria had a significant missile arsenal, including 67 SCUD-B, 50 FROG-7 and 24 SS-23 ballistic missiles. In 2002, Bulgaria disbanded the Rocket Forces despite nationwide protests, and has disbanded its submarine component. Bulgaria is to have 27,000 standing troops by 2014, consisting of 14,310 troops in the land forces, 6,750 in the air force, 3,510 in the navy and 2,420 in the joint command. In 2018, the Bulgarian Armed Forces numbers around 33,150 soldiers, 73 aircraft, 2234 vehicles including 531 tanks, and 29 naval assets.

Organization

Defence Staff 
The Bulgarian Armed Forces are headquartered in Sofia, where most of the Defence staff is based. Until recently the supreme military institution was the General Staff and the most senior military officer was known as the Chief of the General Staff. After the latest military reform has been implemented the General Staff became a department within the Ministry of Defence and for that matter its name had to be changed to match the new situation. For that reason the former GS became the Defence Staff and the supreme military commander became the Chief of Defence. Currently headed by Chief of Defence admiral Emil Eftimov, the Defence Staff is responsible for operational command of the Bulgarian Army and its three major branches. Deputies: Vice Admiral Petar Petrov, General Atanas Zaprianov, General Dimitar Zekhtinov.

Supreme officer rank assignments in the Bulgarian Army and other militarised services

Established by Executive Order of the President № 85 / 28.02.2012, most recent amendment published in the State Gazette Issue 96 from December 2, 2022:

Ministry of Defence
 Chief of Defence – General / Admiral
 Deputy Chief of Defence – Lieutenant-General / Vice-Admiral
 Deputy Chief of Defence – Lieutenant-General / Vice-Admiral (until October 1, 2014 Major-General / Rear-Admiral)
 Defense Staff
 Director of the Defence Staff – Major-General / Rear-Admiral (established on May 6, 2018, the de-facto Chief of Staff of the BAF)
 Director, "Operations and Training" Directorate – Brigade General / Flotilla Admiral
 Director, "Logistics" Directorate – Brigade General / Flotilla Admiral
 Director, "Strategical Planning" Directorate – Brigade General / Flotilla Admiral
 Director, "Communication and Information Systems" Directorate – Brigade General / Flotilla Admiral
 Director, "Defence Policy and Planning" Directorate (established on January 1, 2019) – Brigade General / Flotilla Admiral
 Joint Forces Command
 Commander, Joint Forces Command – Major-General / Rear-Admiral (until August 31, 2021 Lieutenant-General / Vice-Admiral)
 Deputy Commander, Joint Forces Command – Brigade General / Flotilla Admiral (until August 31, 2021 Major-General / Rear-Admiral)
 Chief of Staff, Joint Forces Command – Brigade General / Flotilla Admiral
 Land Forces
 Commander, Land Forces – Major-General
 Deputy Commander, Land Forces – Brigade General
 Chief of Staff, Land Forces – Brigade General
 Commander, 2nd Mechanised Brigade – Brigade General
 Commander, 61st Mechanised Brigade – Brigade General
 Air Forces
 Commander, Air Forces – Major-General
 Deputy Commander, Air Forces – Brigade General
 Commander, 3rd Air Base – Brigade General
 Commander, 24th Air Base – Brigade General
 Navy
 Commander, Naval Forces – Rear-Admiral
 Deputy Commander, Naval Forces – Flotilla Admiral
 Commander, Combat and Support Ships Fltilla – Flotilla Admiral
 Joint Special Forces Command
 Commander, Joint Special Forces Command – Major-General
 Logistics Support Command (established on September 1, 2021)
 Commander, Logistics Support Command – Brigade General
 Communications and Information Support and Cyber-Defence Command (established on September 1, 2021 on the basis of the Stationary Communications and Information System)
 Commander, Communications and Information Support and Cyber-Defence Command – Brigade General
 Military Police Service, directly subordinated to the Minister of Defense
 Director, Military Police Service – Brigade General / Flotilla Admiral
 Military Intelligence Service, directly subordinated to the Minister of Defense
 Director, Military Intelligence Service – Brigade General / Flotilla Admiral or civil servant equal in rank
 Military education institutions, directly subordinated to the Minister of Defense
 Chief of the "Georgi Stoykov Rakovski" Military Academy – Major-General / Rear-Admiral
 Chief of the Military Medical Academy and the Armed Forces Medical Service – Major-General / Rear-Admiral
 Chief of the "Vasil Levski" National Military University – Brigade General
 Chief of the "Georgi Benkovski" Higher Air Force School (re-established on January 1, 2020) – Brigade General
 Chief of the "Nikola Yonkov Vaptsarov" Higher Naval School – Flotilla Admiral
 Other positions at the Ministry of Defense 
 Military Advisor on Military Security Matters to the Supreme Commander-in-Chief, the President of the Republic of Bulgaria – Major-General / Rear-Admiral
 Military Representative of the Chief of Defense at the NATO Military Committee and at the EU Military Committee – Lieutenant-General / Vice-Admiral
 Director of the Cooperation and Regional Security Directorate at the NATO Military Committee – Major-General / Rear-Admiral
 National Military Representative at the NATO Supreme Headquarters Allied Powers Europe – Major-General / Rear-Admiral
 Deputy Commander of the NATO Rapid Deployment Corps - Greece (Thessaloniki) – Major-General / Rear-Admiral
 Deputy Chief of Staff for Operations, Multinational Corps Southeast – Sibiu, Romania – Brigade General

In addition to the aforementioned positions, there are general rank positions in the National Intelligence Service and the National Close Protection Service (the bodyguard service to high-ranking officials and visiting dignitaries). These two services are considered part of the Armed Forces of the Republic of Bulgaria, but are directly subordinated to the President of Bulgaria and fall out of the jurisdiction of the Ministry of Defense.
 National Intelligence Service
 With the transformation of the National Intelligence Service into the State Agency for Intelligence the positions of Director, National Intelligence Service (Major-General / Rear-Admiral) and Deputy Director, National Intelligence Service (Brigade General / Flotilla Admiral) were stricken from the list of supreme officer assignments through Executive Order of the President №58/22.03.2016. The newly established positions are the civilian assignments of Chairman and Deputy-Chairman of the State Agency for Intelligence. 
 National Close Protection Service
 Director, National Close Protection Service - Major-General / Rear-Admiral
 Deputy Director, National Close Protection Service - Brigade General / Flotilla Admiral

With the establishment of the State Agency for National Security - SANS (Bulgarian: Darzhavna Agentsiya za Natsionalna Sigurnost - DANS, Държавна агенция за национална сигурност - ДАНС) part of the military security personnel came under its authority. Before that the security aspects of the armed forces were handled by a unified organisation under the General Staff - the "Military Service of Security and Military Police". After the formation of SANS the service was split, with the military counter-intelligence personnel entering the newly formed structure and the military police personnel staying under Ministry of Defense subordination. While technically civilian servants not part of the armed forces, the military counter-intelligence personnel of the State Agency of National Security retain their military ranks.

Ministry of Defence 
Ministry of Defence
The organisation of the Ministry of Defence includes:

 Minister of Defence
 3 Deputy-Ministers of Defence
 Political Cabinet
 Permanent Secretary of Defence (the highest-ranking civil servant of the Ministry)
 Inspectorate
 General Administration
 "Administration and Information Support" Directorate
 "Public Relations and Protocol" Directorate
 "Finances" Directorate
 Specialised Administration
 "Defence Infrastructure" Main Directorate
 "Defence Policy and Planning" Directorate
 "Planing, Programming and Budgeting" Directorate
 "Defence Legal Activities" Directorate
 "Defence Human Resources Management" Directorate
 "Defence Public Orders" Directorate
 "Armament Policy" Directorate
 "Social Policy and Military-Patriotic Upbringing" Directorate
 "Security of Information" Directorate
 "Internal Audit" Directorate
 "Financial Control and Check of Material Accountability" Unit
 Civil servant in charge of personal data protection
 Chief of Defence (the highest-ranking officer, the only four-star rank on active duty)
 Deputy-Chief of Defence (Lieutenant-General / Vice-Admiral)
 Deputy-Chief of Defence (Lieutenant-General / Vice-Admiral)
 Director of the Defence Staff (Major-General / Rear-Admiral, the Defence Staff is the successor of the General Staff and thus the Director is the Chief of Staff of the Bulgarian Army)
 "Operations and Training" Directorate
 "Logistics" Directorate
 "Strategical Planning" Directorate
 "Communication and Information Systems" Directorate
 "Defence Policy and Planning" Directorate
 Command Sergeant-Major of the Bulgarian Army

Structures directly subordinated to the Ministry of Defence 
Structures directly subordinated to the Ministry of Defence include:
 Defence Intelligence Service, Sofia (commanded by a Major-General/ Rear-Admiral)
 Director
 Directorate
 Information Division
 Analysis Division
 Resources Supply Division
 Military Police Service, Sofia (commanded by a Brigade General / Flotilla Admiral)
 Military Police Command
 Military Police Operational Company (MRAV Sand Cat)
 Regional Military Police Service Sofia
 Regional Military Police Service Plovdiv
 Regional Military Police Service Pleven
 Regional Military Police Service Varna
 Regional Military Police Service Sliven
 Military Police Service Logistics and Training Centre, Sofia
 Military Geographical Service
 MGS Headquarters
 Geographical Information Support Centre
 Geodesic Observatory (GPS Observatory)
 Military Geographical Centre
 Information Security Unit
 Financial Comptroller
 National Guards Unit, Sofia (commanded by a Colonel)
 Headquarters
 1st Guards Battalion
 2nd Mixed Guards Battalion
 National Guards Unit Representative Military Band
 Armed Forces Representative Dance Company
 Guardsmen Training Centre
 Logistics Support Company
 Military Medical Academy, Sofia (commanded by a Major-General / Rear-Admiral)
 Chief of the MMA, Chief of the MATH - Sofia and General Surgeon of the Bulgarian Armed Forces
 Deputy Chief for Diagnostics and Medical Treatment Activities
 Deputy Chief for Education and Scientific Activities
 Deputy Chief for Medical Support of Military Units and Overseas Military Missions
 Multiprofile Active Treatment Hospital - Sofia
 Multiprofile Active Treatment Hospital (informally known as the Naval Hospital)- Varna
 Multiprofile Active Treatment Hospital - Plovdiv
 Multiprofile Active Treatment Hospital - Sliven
 Multiprofile Active Treatment Hospital - Pleven
 Follow-up Long-term Treatment and Rehabilitation Hospital "Saint George the Victorious" - Pomorie
 Follow-up Long-term Treatment and Rehabilitation Hospital "Caleroya" - Hisar
 Follow-up Long-term Treatment and Rehabilitation Hospital - Bankya
 Military Medical Quick Reaction Force (expeditionary disaster and crisis relief unit)
 Psychological Health and Prevention Centre
 Scientific and Application Centre for Military Medical Expertise and Aviation and Seaborne Medicine
 Scientific and Application Centre for Military Epidemiology and Hygiene
 Military Academy "Georgi Stoykov Rakovski", Sofia (commanded by a Major-General / Rear-Admiral)
 Command
 Commandant of the Military Academy
 Deputy Chief for Study and Scientific Activities
 Deputy Chief for Administrative Activities and Logistics
 Administrative Units
 Personnel and Administrative Support Department
 Logistics Department
 Study and Scientific Activities Department
 Financial Department
 Library and Publishing Activities Sector
 Public Relations, International Activities and Protocol Sector
 Training Units
 National Security and Defence College
 Command Staff College
 Peacekeeping Operations and Computer Simulations Sector
 Foreign Languages Studies Department
 Perspective Defence Research Institute
 National Military University "Vasil Levski", Veliko Tarnovo (commanded by a Brigade General)
 Combined Arms Education Department, Veliko Tarnovo
 Artillery and Communication Systems Education Department, Shumen
 NCO School, Veliko Tarnovo
 Foreign Languages and Computer Systems Education Department, Shumen
 Higher Air Force School "Georgi Benkovski", Dolna Mitropoliya (commanded by a Brigade General, temporarily a faculty of the NMU, reinstated on January 20, 2020)
Higher Naval School "Nikola Yonkov Vaptsarov", Varna (commanded by a Flotilla Admiral)
 Chief of the Higher Naval Officer School
 Deputy Chief for Administration and Logistics
 Deputy Chief for Studies and Science Activities
 Navigation Department
 Engineering Department
 Post-Graduate Qualification Department
 Professional Petty Officers College
 Defence Institute "Prof. Tsvetan Lazarov", Sofia
 The Defence Institute is the research and development administration of the MoD. It includes the:
 Administration and Financial Management Department
 Military Standardisation, Quality and Certification Department
 Armament, Equipment and Materials Development Department
 Armament, Equipment and Materials Testing and Control Department
 C4I Systems Development Department
 Central Artillery Technical Evaluation Proving Ground, Stara Zagora
 Central Office of Military District, Sofia
 Commandment Service of the Ministry of Defence, Sofia
 The Commandment Service is an institution in charge of real estate management, transportation, library services, documentation publishing and communications support for the central administration of the MoD, transportation support to the immediate MoD personnel, classified information, cryptographic and perimeter security for the MoD administration buildings.
 Director
 Deputy Director
 Chief Legal Advisor
 Financial Comptroller
 Administrative Department
 Financial Department
 Business Department
 Transportation Support Department
 Support Department
 CIS Support Department
 Technical Centre for Armed Forces Information Security
 Executive Agency for the Military Clubs and Recreational Activities, Sofia
 National Museum of Military History, Sofia

Joint Forces Command 
The Joint Operational Command (Съвместно оперативно командване (СОК)) was established on October 15, 2004 with HQ in Sofia. The country became member of NATO in the same year and this reorganisation was done to streamline the Bulgarian Armed Forces to NATO practices. The planing and execution of military operation was transferred from the respective armed service commands to a joint organisation.

In 2010 the Ministry of Defence completed a thorough study of the defence policy and issued a White Book, or a White Paper on Defence, calling for a major overhaul of the structure of Defence Forces. On July 1, 2011 the Joint Operational Command was reorganised into the Joint Forces Command (Съвместно командване на силите (СКС)) According to the document the military of the Republic of Bulgaria should include two mechanized brigades, four regiments (Logistics, Artillery, Engineering, SpecOps), four battalions (Reconnaissance, Mechanized, NBC, psychological operations) in the Land Forces; two air bases, SAM air defense base and Air force training base in the Air Force; and one naval base consisting of two homeports in the Navy. There are seven brigade level formations, including the two mechanised brigades and the special forces brigade of the army, the two air bases of the air force, the naval base and the logistical brigade of the JOC. 

On September 1, 2021 the Joint Forces Command was reorganised again in accordance with the Development Plant for the Armed Forces until 2026 (План за развитие на Въоръжените сили до 2026 г.), set in action by Resolution of the Government № 183/07.05.2021. The logistics brigade and the movement control units of the JFC formed the Logistics Support Command. Since then the Joint Forces Command has seven units directly subordinated to it:

Military Command Centre
Operational Intelligence Information Center 
 Centre for Radiological, Chemical, Biological and Ecological Environment Monitoring and Control
 Mobile Communication and Information System
 Operational Archive of the Bulgarian Army
 Joint Forces Training Range "Novo Selo"
 National Military Study Complex "Charalitsa"
 Support and Maintenance Group of the JFC

With the introduction of the new force structure of the Bulgarian Armed Forces the commands of three armed services of the Bulgarian Army - the Land, Air and Naval Forces are responsible for the generation of combat-ready forces, which are transferred under the operational command and control of the JFC. 
 Land Forces Command
 Naval Forces Command
 Air Forces Command

Under the previous structure they were subordinated to the JFC.

The logistics units of the JFC were re-arranged into the newly-formed Logistical Support Command (Командване за логистична поддръжка (КЛП)):

Logistical Support Command, Sofia
Logistics Brigade
 Brigade Headquarters
 1st Transport Battalion, Sofia
 2nd Transport Battalion, Burgas
 Central Supply Base, Negushevo
 repair and maintenance bases
 depots, storage facilities and technical inspection units
 Movement Control Headquarters

The previous 62nd Signals Brigade at Gorna Malina was responsible for maintaining the higher military communication lines. Next to the functions of the Signals Regiment in the Sofia suburb of Suhodol, the brigade had at least three dispersed signals regiments for government communications, such as the 75th Signals Regiment (Lovech), the 65th Signals Regiment (Nova Zagora) and at least one additional unknown Signals Regiment in the Rila-Pirin mountain massif. The modern successor of the 62nd Signals Brigade are the Stationary Communication and Information System (Стационарна Комуникационна Информационна Система (СКИС)) of the Defence Staff (which fulfils also the tasks of SIGINT and Cyber Defence next to its strategic communications mission) and the Mobile Communication and Information System (Мобилна Комуникационна Информационна Система (МКИС)) of the Joint Forces Command.

On September 1, 2021 the Stationary Communications and Information System, which was directly subordinated to the Minister of Defence, became the Communications and Information Support and Cyber-Defence Command (Командване за комуникационно-информационна поддръжка и киберотбрана (ККИПКО)).

 Communications and Information Support and Cyber-Defence Command, Sofia
 Communications and Information Centre
 Government Communications Support Centre,
 Operational Centres
 Engineering and CIS recovery Centre
 Stationary Communications Network

Joint Special Operations Command 
The 68th Special Forces Brigade was removed from the Land Forces' ORBAT on 1 February 2017, de facto becoming the country's fourth combat service. Unlike Bulgaria's Land, Air and Naval Forces however it fell outside of the Joint Forces Command structure, having been assigned directly under the authority of the Chief of Defence. The brigade was transformed into the JSOC, taking effect on November 1, 2019 and its commander, Brigade General Yavor Mateev was promoted to a major general as the chief of the new command.

 Joint Special Operations Command, Plovdiv
 Command Staff and Command Battalion
 68th Special Forces Group (designated in honour of the former 68th Training Para-Recon Base, Plovdiv)
 86th Special Forces Group (designated in honour of the former 86th Training Para-Recon Base, Musachevo)
 1st Special Forces Group (listed on the official JSOC website, missing on the MoD website, status uncertain)
 3rd Special Forces Group
 Training and Combat Support Center
 Logistics Support Battalion
 Medical Point

Personnel and education

Bulgaria's total military personnel as of 2014 is 37,100, of which 30,400 (80.1%) are active military personnel and 8,100 (11.9%) are civilian personnel. The Land Forces are the largest branch, with at least 18,000 men serving there. In terms of percentage, 53% of all Army personnel are in the Land Forces, 25% are in the Air Force, 13% are in the Navy and 9% are in the Joint Forces Command. Annual spending per soldier amounts to 30,000 leva (~ 15,000 euro) and is scheduled to increase to 43,600 leva by 2014.

Unlike many former Soviet bloc militaries, discipline and morale problems are not common. During the Communist era, the army members enjoyed extensive social privileges. After the fall of Communism and Bulgaria's transition to a market economy, wages fell severely. For almost a decade social benefits were virtually non-existent, and some of them have been restored but recently. Nikolai Tsonev, defence minister under the 2005–2009 cabinet, undertook steps to provide the members of the military and their families with certain privileges in terms of healthcare and education, and to improve living conditions.

Military education in Bulgaria is provided in military universities and academies. Due to cuts in spending and manpower some universities have been disbanded and their campuses were included as faculties of other, larger educational entities. The largest institutions of military education in Bulgaria are:
 Vasil Levski National Military University
 Rakovski Defence and Staff College
 Nikola Vaptsarov Naval Academy
 Military Medical Academy – a mixed military academy/hospital institution

Training

The Land Forces practice extensive year-round military training in various conditions. Cooperative drills with the United States are very common, the last series of them conducted in 2008. Bulgaria's most recent full-scale exercise simulating a foreign invasion was carried out in 2009. It was conducted at the Koren range, and included some 1,700 personnel with tanks, ATGMs, attack aircraft, AA guns and armored vehicles. The combat skills of individual soldiers are on a very high level, on par with troops of the U.S. Army.

Until recent years the Air Force suffered somewhat from fuel shortages; a problem which was overcome in 2008. Fighter pilots have year-round flights, but gunship pilots do not fly often due to the yet unfulfilled modernization of the Mi-24 gunships. Due to financial difficulties fighter pilots have 60 hours of flying time per year, only a third of the national norm of 180 hours.

The Navy also has some fuel shortage problems, but military training is still effective. The most recent overseas operation of the Navy was along the coast of Libya as part of Operation Unified Protector.

Budget
After the collapse of the Warsaw pact, Bulgaria lost the ability to acquire cheap fuel and spares for its military. A large portion of its nearly 2,000 T-55 tanks fell into disrepair, and eventually almost all of them were scrapped or sold to other countries. In the early 1990s the budget was so small, that regulars only received token-value payments. Many educated and well-trained officers lost the opportunity to educate younger soldiers, as the necessary equipment and basis lacked adequate funding. Military spending increased gradually, especially in the last 10 years. As of 2005, the budget was no more than $400 mln., while military spending for 2009 amounted to more than $1.3 bln. – almost a triple increase for 4 years. Despite this growth, the military still does not receive sufficient funds for modernisation. An example of bad spending plans is the large-scale purchasing of transport aircraft, while the Air Force has a severe need of new fighters (the MiG-29s, even though modernised, are nearing their operational limits). The planned procurement of 2–4 Gowind class corvettes has been cancelled. As of 2009, military spending was about 1.98% of GDP. In 2010 the budget is to be only 1.3% due to the international financial crisis.

Land Forces

The Land Forces are functionally divided into Deployable and Reserve Forces. Their main functions include deterrence, defence, peace support and crisis management, humanitarian and rescue missions, as well as social functions within Bulgarian society. Active troops in the land forces number about 18,000 men, and reserve troops number about 13,000.

The equipment of the land forces is impressive in terms of numbers, but most of it is nonoperational and scheduled to be scrapped or refurbished and exported to other nations. Bulgaria has a military stockpile of about 5,000,000 small arms, models ranging from World War II-era MP 40 machine pistols to modern Steyr AUG, AK-74, HK MP5, HK416 and AR-M12F assault rifles.

National guard unit

The National Guard of Bulgaria, founded in 1879, is the successor to the personal guards of Knyaz Alexander I. On 12 July of that year, the guards escorted the Bulgarian knyaz for the first time; today the official holiday of the National Guard is celebrated on 12 July. Throughout the years the structure of the guards has evolved, going from convoy to squadron, to regiment and, subsequent to 1942, to division. Today it includes military units for army salute and wind orchestra duties.

In 2001, the National Guard unit was designated an official military unit of the Bulgarian army and one of the symbols of state authority, along with the flag, the coat of arms and the national anthem. It is a formation, directly subordinate to the Minister of Defence and while legally part of the armed forces, it is totally independent from the Defence Staff.

Statistics and equipment

Note: This table shows combined active and reserve force.Most are listed here. 
In 2019 what remained from the scrapping of the previous new equipment some but not all of the T-72 Main battle tanks were sent for mechanical service for the first time in years.
Most of the equipment that should be battle ready is in dire condition, old, rusty or non-functional, the rest about 50,000 tons of what was sold as scrap" can be found in some of the scrap depots near the railroad in Sofia including battle tanks, artillery, and other battle soviet era equipment.

Navy

The Navy has traditionally been the smallest component of the Bulgarian military. Established almost simultaneously with the Ground forces in 1879, initially it consisted of a small fleet of boats on the Danube river. Bulgaria has a coastline of about 354 kilometres – thus, naval warfare is not considered a priority.

After the downturn in 1990, the Navy was largely overlooked and received almost no funding. No projects for modernisation were carried out until 2005, when a Wielingen class frigate (F912 Wandelaar) was acquired from Belgium. By 2009, Bulgaria acquired two more frigates of the same class. The first of them was renamed 41 Drazki and took part in several operations and exercises, most notably the UNIFIL Maritime Patrol along the coast of Lebanon in 2006, and Operation Active Endeavour. It also participated in the enforcement of the naval blockade against Muammar Gaddafi's regime off the coast of Libya from 2011 until 2012.

The equipment is typical for a small navy, consisting mostly of light multi-purpose vessels – four frigates, three corvettes, five minesweepers, three fast missile craft and two landing ships. Other equipment includes a coastal defence missile battalion armed with locally modified P-15 Termit missiles, a coastal artillery battery, a naval helicopter airbase and a marine special forces unit.

The Bulgarian Navy is centered in two main bases – in Varna and in Burgas.

Air Force

In the past decade Bulgaria has been trying actively to restructure its army as a whole and a lot of attention has been placed on keeping the aging Russian aircraft operational. Currently the attack and defence branches of the Bulgarian air force are mainly MiG-29s and Su-25s. About 15 MiG-29 fighters have been modernised in order to meet NATO standards. The first aircraft arrived on 29 November 2007 and final delivery was due in 03/09. In 2006 the Bulgarian government signed a contract with Alenia Aeronautica for the delivery of five C-27J Spartan transport aircraft in order to replace the Soviet made An-24 and An-26, although the contract was later changed to only three aircraft. Modern EU-made transport helicopters were purchased in 2005 and a total of 12 Eurocopter Cougar have been delivered (eight transport and four CSAR).Three Eurocopter AS565 Panther for the Bulgarian Navy in 2016.

Branches of the Air Force include: fighter aviation, assault aviation, intelligence aviation and transportation aviation, aid defence troops, radio-technical troops, communications troops, radio-technical support troops, logistics and medical troops.

The Bulgarian Ministry of Defense has announced plans to withdraw and replace the MiG-29 fighters with new F-16V Fighting Falcon by 2025–2026.

Aircraft inventory

With the exception of the Navy's small helicopter fleet, the Air Forces are responsible for all military aircraft in Bulgaria. The Air Forces' inventory numbers <50 aircraft, including combat jets and helicopters. Aircraft of western origin have only begun to enter the fleet, numbering of the total in service.Most is unusable, old and inactive

Bulgarian-American cooperation

The Bulgarian-American Joint Military Facilities were established by a Defence Cooperation Agreement signed by the United States and Bulgaria in April 2006. Under the agreement, U.S. forces can conduct training at several bases in the country, which remain under Bulgarian command and under the Bulgarian flag. Under the agreement, no more than 2,500 U.S. military personnel can be located at the joint military facilities.

Foreign Policy magazine lists Bezmer Air Base as one of the six most important overseas facilities used by the USAF.

Deployments
Both during Communist rule and after, Bulgaria has deployed troops with different tasks in various countries. The table below lists Bulgarian military deployments in foreign countries. Active missions are shown in bold.

See also

 Defense industry of Bulgaria
 Bulgaria and weapons of mass destruction
 Medieval Bulgarian Army

References

Sources
 
 Бяла книга на Въоръжените сили (White Paper of the Armed Forces), Ministry of Defence of Bulgaria, 2011.
 Wikisource:Great Battles of Bulgaria

Bibliography

External links
 Ministry of Defence of Bulgaria
 Equipment holdings in 1996
 https://web.archive.org/web/20110528070137/http://www.wikileaks.ch/cable/2007/10/07SOFIA1271.html – U.S. Embassy Sofia views via United States diplomatic cables leak on appropriate future equipment purchases, 2007
 http://www.mediafire.com/download/heyrxhrnpqx06mz/Bulgarian_Military.docx and http://www.mediafire.com/download/ba571l7jiid2tf8/Bulgarian+Military.pdf - Download the word file and a pdf file for the Bulgarian Military's equipment list and specific details.

Military of Bulgaria
Permanent Structured Cooperation